Mirkovci can refer to:

Mirkovci, Croatia, a village near Vinkovci
Mirkovci, North Macedonia, a village in the Čučer-Sandevo municipality
Mirkovci, Serbia, a village near Pirot